Kinnauri, also known as Kanauri, Kanor, Koonawur, Kanawari or Kunawar (Takri: 𑚊𑚮𑚝𑚵𑚤𑚯/𑚊𑚝𑚵𑚤𑚯/𑚊𑚝𑚵𑚤/𑚊𑚱𑚝𑚭𑚦𑚰𑚤/𑚊𑚰𑚝𑚦𑚤, Tibetan:ཀིནཽརཱི), is a Sino-Tibetan dialect cluster centered on the Kinnaur district of the Indian state of Himachal Pradesh.

Kaike, once thought to be Kinnauri, is closer to Tamangic. Bhoti Kinnauri and Tukpa (locally called Chhoyuli) are Bodish (Lahauli–Spiti).

Linguistic varieties and geographical distribution

Kinnaur has nearly ten linguistic varieties, with Kinnauri being the major language. Ethnologue lists the following locations for Kinnauri proper and related languages.

Kinnauri-speaking villages are from Badhal Rampur Bushahr to Sangla and north along Satluj river to Morang. Mainly the Kinnauri-speaking area is located in lower parts of Kinnaur district in Himachal Pradesh. The estimated population of Kinnauri speaking people is 45,000. 

Chitkuli Kinnauri is spoken by a thousand people in the Baspa river area of the Sangla valley in Nichar subdivision, Kinnaur district, Himachal Pradesh (in Chitkul and Rakchham villages).

Jangshung is spoken in Morang tehsil, Kinnaur district, Himachal Pradesh (in Jangi, Lippa, and Asrang villages). These villages have a population of nearly 2600.

Sumcho is spoken in Poo tehsil, Kinnaur district, Himachal Pradesh (in Kanam, Labrang, Spilo, Shyaso, Taling, and Rushkaling villages) by a population of 2500.

Bhoti Kinnauri is spoken in Poo division of upper Kinnaur. The language shows slight phonemic variations in the valley. Main varieties are spoken in Poo Hangrang and Nako villages. It is a generic Tibetan language spoken by nearly 7000 people.'  

Chhoyuli is a Tibetic language spoken in Nesang and Kunnu Charan villages of Poo division in upper Kinnaur. It has a population of around 700. The language is considered a variety of Bhoti Kinnauri but is shows enough characteristics to stand as an independent language. 

Sunnami language is spoken in Sunnam village of Poo division in upper Kinnaur. It has a population of about 700.

Pahari Kinnauri is an Indo-Aryan language of Kinnaur spoken mainly by the Scheduled Caste community of Nichar, Kalpa, Sangla and    Moorang tehsils in Kinnaur. It has a population of 9000.

In absence of a detailed sociolinguistic survey on language use, the actual number of fluent speakers of KLs is unknown. The actual number of speakers is much lower than the total population. Census data include native as well as the non native and the migratory workers in the survey.

Phonology
This description is of the Pangi dialect of Kinnauri.

Vowels
Kinnauri has six pairs of long/short vowels:

Syllables

, aspirated obstruents (i.e.

All consonants may occur in onsets and word-medially.

Kinnauri has the following types of syllables:

 
 
 

Grammar

Kinnauri is SOV, V-auxiliary, postpositional, and has head-final noun phrases. It shows case marking with an ergative alignment in the past tense, nominative-accusative elsewhere. The ergative case is identical to the instrumental. There is no distinction between accusative and dative, and a genitive is partially syncretic with the accusative/dative. An ablative case is also recognized, normally attached outside the genitive but with different allomorphs for animate and inanimate referents. There is also a locative case, normally used only with inanimate nouns.

 Script 
The native script of the language is a variety of Takri script.

Language vitality

Kinnaura people are bilinguals who speak Hindi along with their mother tongue. Hindi is the main lingua franca for people from different language groups in Kinnaur. It is also the main language in schools, colleges, government offices, market place, banks and more such domains. Younger generation is exposed to entertainment media like movies, music, mobile phone, newspapers etc., in Hindi. Kinnauri songs beings produced show heavy influence of Hindi. Young learners are encouraged to learn and speak Hindi in order to benefit in education and employment in future. Fluent speakers of Kinnauri are only the elders or the mid aged people who have little exposure to the outer world or are still unaffected by the modernity. But whether the next generation will inherit the cultural knowledge or the legacy of ancestors is doubted. From UNESCO factors study, all languages in Kinnaur region are definitely endangered, inter-generational transmission is unsafe, number of speakers using Kinnauri as first language is very low, domains are shifting, Hindi is replacing Kinnauri in most domains, there is lack of literary traditions,  government support towards the protection and promotion of Kinnaur language or culture is absent, very little is known about the linguistic structure of the languages in the region.
Like other tribal languages, Kinnauri too may lose much of its linguistic characteristics due to lack of proper documentation and government support and community apathy as well. Among urgent measures, Kinnauri languages need community collaborative efforts to document and discuss among the locals, scholars, linguists and researchers.

References

Bibliography
 Nagano, Yasuhiko; & LaPolla, Randy J. (Eds.). (2001). New research on Zhangzhung and related Himalayan languages''. Bon studies 3, Senri ethnological reports 19. Osaka: National Museum of Ethnology.
  Negi, Harvinder. 2012. A Sociolinguistic profile of the Kinnaura tribe. Nepalese Linguistics. Vol. 27, pp 101-105 http://himalaya.socanth.cam.ac.uk/collections/journals/nepling/pdf/Nep_Ling_27.pdf

 
 Takahashi, Yoshiharu. 2007. On the deictic patterns in Kinnauri (Pangi dialect). In Roland Bielmeier and Felix Haller (eds.). Linguistics of the Himalayas and beyond, 341-354. Berlin, New York: Mouton de Gruyter.
 Takahashi, Yoshiharu (2009) “On the Verbal Affixes in West Himalayan”. Issues in Tibeto-Burman Historical Linguistics, Yasuhiko Nagano, ed. special issue of Senri Ethnological Studies 75: 21–49.
 Takahashi, Yoshiharu (2012). "On a Middle Voice Suffix in Kinnauri (Pangi dialect) Yoshiharu". Objectivization and Subjectivization: A Typology of Voice Systems Edited by Wataru Nakamura and Ritsuko Kikusawa, eds., special issue of Senri Ethnological Studies 77: 157–175.

Languages of Himachal Pradesh
Kinnaur district
Endangered languages of India
West Himalayish languages